Arthur Mills Lea (10 August 1868 – 29 February 1932) was an Australian entomologist.

Lea was born in Surry Hills, New South Wales, the second son of Thomas Lea, from Bristol, England, and his wife Cornelia, née Dumbrell, of Sydney.
As a child, Lea was interested in insects and studied them in his spare time. He worked for a chartered accountant firm in Sydney for a while, then became an assistant entomologist for the minister of Agriculture at Sydney in 1891. In 1895 he became government entomologist in Western Australia. Then in 1899 he was appointed government entomologist in Tasmania, where succeeded in controlling Codling Moth.

From 1912 to 1924 Lea taught at University of Adelaide; he specialised in the study of beetles. From 1924 he took a 12-month appointment with the government of Fiji to investigate the Levuana moth, a pest attacking copra crops. Lea searched for a fly parasite, eventually finding one in Malaya, of the family Tachinidae. However, the flies died on transport by ship to Fiji. Later on, the same fly species was introduced to Fiji without Lea getting credit. (see John Douglas Tothill)

Lea also collected specimens in New Caledonia, and when his eyesight began to fail he relied on his assistant, Norman Tindale to make drawings. In all, he described 5,432 new beetle species, and was a fellow of the Linnean Society of New South Wales, of the Royal Society of South Australia and of the Entomological Society of London.

His zoological author abbreviation is Lea.

References

E. G. Matthews, 'Lea, Arthur Mills (1868 - 1932)', Australian Dictionary of Biography, Volume 10, MUP, 1986, pp 31–32. Retrieved on 2009-07-17

University of Melbourne - brief biography.

External links
Obituary Notice of Arthur Mills Lea- Transactions of the Royal Society of South Australia
Obituary Notice Sydney Morning Herald 2 April 1932
Australian Postal History

Australian entomologists
Coleopterists
Botanical collectors active in Australia 
Public servants of Tasmania
Scientists from Sydney
Academic staff of the University of Adelaide
1868 births
1932 deaths
Public servants of Western Australia